The 1892 Orange Athletic Club football team was an American football team that represented the Orange Athletic Club in the American Football Union (AFU) during the 1892 college football season. The AFU in 1892 consisted of three amateur football teams – the Orange Athletic Club, the New York Athletic Club from Manhattan, and the Crescent Athletic Club from Brooklyn. The Orange team played its home games at the Orange Oval in East Orange, New Jersey, compiled a 4–4–4 record (1–1 against AFU opponents), and played against some of the best teams in the country, losing to Yale 58 to 0 and Princeton 23 to 0.  On December 17th, the OAC faced the Varuna Boat Club of Bay Ridge in one of the most well-known sport venues in the United States, Madison Square Garden.

Schedule

References

Orange Athletic Club
Orange Athletic Club football seasons
Orange Athletic Club football